Crackpot is a village in Swaledale, North Yorkshire, England. Its name derives from the Old English kraka (crow) and the Viking word pot (usually a pit or deep hole often in the bed of a river, but in this case it refers to a rift in the limestone).

Crackpot Cave

Located south of Crackpot in Scurvey Scar, Crackpot Cave contains a column where a stalactite has joined up with its stalagmite. It is accessible through the aptly named Knee-wrecker Passage.

References

External links

Villages in North Yorkshire
Swaledale
Caves of North Yorkshire